
Tutak or Tootak may refer to:

Afghanistan
Tutak, Badakhshan
Tutak, Badghis
Tutak, Daykundi
Tutak, Farah
Tutak, Ghor
Tutak, Helmand
Tutak, Herat
Tutak, Khost
Tutak, Takhar

Iran
Tutak, Isfahan
Tutak, Gilan
Tutak-e Olya, Kerman province
Tutak-e Sofla, Kerman province
Tutak, Sistan and Baluchestan
Tutak, Iranshahr, Sistan and Baluchestan province
Tutak, South Khorasan
Tutak, Tehran
Tutak, Marvast, Yazd province
Tutak Rural District, Yazd province

Pakistan
Tutak, Pakistan

Turkey
Tutak, Turkey, Ağrı Province
Tutak District, Ağrı Province

Uzbekistan
Tutak, Uzbekistan